The Jodel DR1050 Excellence and Ambassadeur are part of a family of French built aircraft, designed by Jean Délémontez (the principal designer of Jodel aircraft) in collaboration with Pierre Robin, as a development of the Jodel D.10 project. The aircraft was built from 1958 to 1967 both by Centre-Est Aeronautique (CEA) (see Robin Aircraft) and by Société Aéronautique Normande (SAN) but since the demise of the latter in 1968 has only been supplied as plans.

Design and development
The original aircraft was designated the DR.100 and features a cantilever low-wing, a three-seat enclosed cockpit, fixed, tailwheel conventional landing gear with a single engine in tractor configuration. This was developed ultimately to the DR1050M1 Sicile Record with swept fin and many other refinements such as wheel pants and improved canopy.  Versions were manufactured by both SAN and CEA and variously named Ambassadeur, Excellence, Sicile, and Sicile Record. At least 618 of the family were constructed, 286 by SAN and 332 by CEA, between 1958 and 1965. Tricycle landing gear is optional on home-built aircraft.

This design was further developed by CEA as the DR200/220/250 series and subsequently as the Robin DR400 series.

The aircraft is made from wood, with its flying surfaces covered in doped aircraft fabric. The standard engine used is the  Continental O-200 four-stroke powerplant.

Variants
DR.100
Original version with  Continental C90 engine.
DR.105
First production version with  Continental O-200-A engine. 
DR.1050
Improved version with Continental O-200-A engine or with  Potez 4E engine (as DR.1051).
DR.1050M
Modified version of DR.1050, with swept fin, one piece all-moving tailplane and available with Continental O-200-A or Potez 4E engines (as DR.1051M).
DR.1050M1
Final version of DR.1050, with one piece all-moving tailplane and available with Continental O-200-A or Potez 4E engines (as DR.1051M1).

Specifications (DR1050)

References

External links

Photo of a DR1050

Homebuilt aircraft
Single-engined tractor aircraft
Excellence
Low-wing aircraft